Waterland is a municipality in the Netherlands, located in the province of North Holland. It is situated north of Amsterdam, on the western shore of the Markermeer. It is well-known for comprising the touristy towns of Broek in Waterland and Marken.

Population centres 
The municipality of Waterland consists of the following cities, towns, villages and districts:

Topography

Topographic map of the municipality of Waterland, 2013.

Local government 
The municipal council of Waterland consists of 17 seats, which are divided as follows:

Notable people 

 Pieter Floriszoon (1602 or 1606 in Monnickendam – 1658) a Dutch Vice Admiral in the Battle of the Sound
 Alexander Johan Berman (1828 in Zierikzee – 1886) the Dutch Reformed minister of Watergang
 Pieter Groenhart (1894 in Ilpendam – 1965) a Dutch lichenologist, researched tropical Asian lichens
 Wim Polak (1924–1999) a Dutch politician, lived in Ilpendam, Mayor of Amsterdam 1977/1983
 Peter Spier (1927–2017) a Dutch-American illustrator and writer of children's books, grew up in Broek in Waterland 
 Michaël Zeeman (1958 in Marken – 2009) a Dutch journalist, author, editor, columnist and literary critic
 Sita (born 1980 in Ilpendam) aka Sita Maria Vermeulen, a Dutch pop singer

Sport 
 Jurjaan Koolen (born 1938) a Dutch volleyball player, competed in the 1964 Summer Olympics
 Marko Klok (born 1968 in Monnickendam) a volleyball player, silver medallist in the 1992 Summer Olympics
 Annette Gerritsen (born 1985 in Ilpendam) a Dutch former speed skater, silver medallist at the 2010 Winter Olympics

Gallery

References

External links

Official website

 
Municipalities of North Holland